Aritomo (written: 有朋 or 存知) is a masculine Japanese given name. Notable people with the name include:

, Imperial Japanese Navy admiral
, Japanese general and Prime Minister of Japan

Japanese masculine given names